Ralph Ostmeyer (May 6, 1943) is a former Republican member of the Kansas Senate, representing the 40th district from 2005 through January 2017. Previously, he served as a Representative in the House (2001–2005). He is a farmer and rancher from Grinnell, and is married to Kay Ostmeyer.

Committee assignments
Ostmeyer served on these legislative committees:
 Agriculture (vice-chair)
 Joint Committee on Administrative Rules and Regulations
 Federal and State Affairs
 Local Government

Major donors
Some of the top contributors to Ostmeyer's 2008 campaign, according to  OpenSecrets, were:
 Koch Industries, Kansas Association of Realtors, Kansas Contractors Association, John G. Lewis, Dana C. Lewis, Kansas Republican Senatorial Committee

Financial, insurance and real estate were his largest donor group, followed by energy and natural resources companies.

References

External links
Kansas Senate Biography
Project Vote Smart profile
 Campaign contributions: 2000, 2002, 2004, 2006, 2008

Republican Party Kansas state senators
People from Gove County, Kansas
Living people
1943 births
21st-century American politicians